USS Betty Jane I (ID-3458), also listed as SP-3458, was a United States Navy patrol vessel in commission from 1917 to 1919.

Betty Jane I was built in 1913 as a private motorboat of the same name by the Electric Launch Company (ELCO) at Bayonne, New Jersey. On 4 September 1917, the U.S. Navy acquired her under a free lease from her owner, Percy Ballentyne of South Montrose, Pennsylvania, for use as a section patrol boat during World War I. She was commissioned later that day as USS Betty Jane I.

Assigned to the 6th Naval District, Betty Jane I patrolled the southeastern coast of the United States for the rest of World War I. In September 1918, she received a registration number, although sources disagree on whether this was the section patrol number SP-3458 or the naval registry identification number ID-3458.<ref>Dictionary of American naval Fighting Ships at http://www.history.navy.mil/danfs/b6/betty-jane1-i.htm and Department of the Navy Naval History and Heritage Command Online Library of Selected Images: Civilian Ships: Betty Jane I (American Motor Boat, 1913). Served as USS Betty Jane I (ID # 3458) in 1917–1919.</ref>Betty Jane I'' was stricken from the Navy Directory on 17 January 1919 and the Navy returned her to Ballentyne the same day.

Notes

References

Department of the Navy Naval History and Heritage Command Online Library of Selected Images: Civilian Ships: Betty Jane I (American Motor Boat, 1913). Served as USS Betty Jane I (ID # 3458) in 1917–1919
NavSource Online: Section Patrol Craft Photo Archive betty Jane I (SP 3458)

Patrol vessels of the United States Navy
World War I patrol vessels of the United States
Ships built in Bayonne, New Jersey
1913 ships